PNTL may refer to:

Policia Nacional de Timor-Leste (PNTL), the National Police of East Timor
PNTL FC, a police football club come from Dili, Timor-Leste
Pacific Nuclear Transport Limited, a shipping company specialising in the transport of nuclear material between Europe and Japan
Playing Not To Lose (PNTL)